The Athens International Airport Archaeological Collection is a museum on level 2 outside security in the main terminal building of Athens International Airport in Spata, Attica, Greece.

The collection was established in 2003 and houses 177 ancient artefacts which were uncovered during construction work at the site,  once a flourishing agricultural area in ancient times.

References

Archaeological museums in Attica
2003 establishments in Greece
Museums established in 2003
Archaeological collections in Greece